Andrulla Blanchette (born Androulla Veronica Blanchette; 29 July 1966) is an English professional female bodybuilder.

Bodybuilding career

Amateur career
After Andrulla's judo sessions, she would go to a little room in the small community center with a few weights where she would play around with. A male powerlifter saw potential in her strength and how easily she lifted heavy weights. They became friends, lovers, as well as workout partners. In a few weeks, he had her deadlifting  for reps. At her gym, a lot of men and one female were entering bodybuilding competitions. They talked her into entering the Miss London Championships with only a week’s notice. She learned some poses the day before and won. While there was 15 women in it who trained for several years, she had more muscle. She  obtained her IFBB pro card at the World Games (Netherlands) in 1993. Andrulla is Black Belt First Dan in Judo. From 1986 to 2000, her couch and mentor was her boyfriend, British professional bodybuilder Ian Dowe.

Professional career
In 1996, Andrulla was named Women's Physique Worlds European Bodybuilder of the Year. She won the Ms. Olympia lightweight title in 2000, and just missed retaining the title the following year. When asked about drugs, she said, "People aren't stupid, they know what's going on, and I'm not going to insult them with a fib." In 2002, Blanchette was scheduled to compete Ms. International, but was disqualified on Thursday night for not signing a contract to compete.

Legacy
Currently, she is the most successful female British bodybuilder in the world, by being the only British bodybuilder to win the Ms. Olympia.

Competition history
Amateur competitions
1986 Miss Capital City - 1st
1986 EFBB Qualifier (for the under 21s) - 1st
1986 Place Junior British Championship - 1st
1986 IFBB Junior Worlds - 4th
1988 IFBB Women's World Championship - 10th (LW)
1992 IFBB Women's World Championship - 3rd (LW)
1993 IFBB European Championship - 1st (LW)
1993 IFBB World Games - 1st (LW)
Professional competitions
1995 IFBB Jan Tana Classic - 6th
1996 IFBB European Pro Classic - 3rd
1996 IFBB European Cup - 3rd
1996 IFBB Ms. International - 11th
1996 IFBB Ms. Olympia - 8th
1997 IFBB Ms. Olympia - 7th
1998 IFBB Ms. International - 6th
1998 IFBB Ms. Olympia - 6th
1999 IFBB Ms. International - 5th
1999 IFBB Ms. Olympia - 7th
2000 IFBB Ms. International - 2nd (LW)
2000 IFBB Ms. Olympia - 1st (LW)
2001 IFBB Ms. Olympia - 2nd (LW)

Best statistics
 45 degree leg press -  for repsANDRULLA BLANCHETTE
 Barbell curls - 
 Biceps - 
 Bust/waist/hip measurements - ,  and 
 Cheat-curled - 
 Dumbbell one-arm rows - 
 Chest - 
 Height - 
 Incline dumbbell press -  each
 Lat-pulldowns - 
 Lats - 
 Leg press - 
 On season weight:
  (1996)
  (1999 Ms. International)
  (1999 Ms. Olympia)
  (2000 Ms. Olympia)
  (2001 Ms. Olympia)An Interview With Ms. Olympia Andrulla Blanchette!
 Shoulder press (dumbell) - 
 Thighs - 

Personal life
She currently lives in London, England.  She is currently an artist, photographer, design worker, chess-player, and personal trainer who owns her own gym in London. She is a Christian.Andrulla Blanchette 

Television appearance
Andrulla has been featured in many UK television shows during her bodybuilding career. In 2002, Blanchette starred on the TV show Lexx, in the episode Viva Lexx Vegas, as "Queen of Sheba".

Motion picture appearance
In 2003, Blanchette starred in the film, The Interplanetary Surplus Male and Amazon Women of Outer Space, as an Amazon.

References

External links
 Profile page from Andy's Muscle Goddesses

| colspan="3" style="text-align:center;"| Ms. Olympia' 

1966 births
Actresses from London
English Christians
English female bodybuilders
English people of French-Canadian descent
English people of German descent
English people of Greek Cypriot descent
English people of Indian descent
English people of Portuguese descent
Living people
Professional bodybuilders
Sportspeople from London